Kevin Danyelle Mitchell (January 1, 1971 – April 30, 2007) was an American football linebacker in the National Football League from Harrisburg, Pennsylvania.  He played for the San Francisco 49ers, the New Orleans Saints, and the Washington Redskins.

College career
Mitchell played college football at Syracuse University as a defensive tackle.  He was the Defensive MVP of the 1993 Fiesta Bowl upset of Colorado where Mitchell had eight tackles, including six behind the line of scrimmage.

Professional career
Mitchell was drafted in the 1994 NFL Draft by the San Francisco 49ers in the second round.  He won Super Bowl XXIX in his rookie season with the 49ers.  He played three more seasons with the 49ers.  He signed with the New Orleans Saints after the 1997 NFL season.  He played with the Saints for two seasons. Mitchell joined the Washington Redskins after the 1999 NFL season and played for them until after the 2003 NFL season.

Mitchell's best season came in 2001 NFL season when he recorded 81 tackles (68 solo), 2 sacks, and one forced fumble in 13 games.

In his career, he recorded 300 tackles (243 solo), 6.5 sacks, two interceptions for seven yards, four forced fumbles, one fumble recovery, and six pass deflections in 144 regular season games.

NFL statistics

Death
On April 30, 2007, Mitchell was found dead in his sleep in Ashburn, Virginia.  According to a preliminary autopsy, he died of a massive heart attack.

Friends and family close to Kevin Mitchell said the cause of death was related to sleep apnea.

References

External links
Remembering Kevin Mitchell from Syracuse.com Football Blog

1971 births
2007 deaths
American football linebackers
Players of American football from Harrisburg, Pennsylvania
Syracuse University alumni
Syracuse Orange football players
San Francisco 49ers players
New Orleans Saints players
Washington Redskins players
People from Ashburn, Virginia
Neurological disease deaths in Virginia